The following is a list of characters from the Twin Star Exorcists anime series.

Characters

Twin Star Exorcists
The  are a couple of exorcists destined to be the parents of the "Miko", the reincarnation of Abe no Seimei and the ultimate exorcist that is said to be capable of cleansing every kind of evil spirit. The Twin Star Exorcists also have a special, exclusive ability called "Resonance", which allows them to combine their forces to increase the power of their attacks or access abilities that no other exorcist possesses. It is also revealed that the Twin Stars are not proper exorcists, but rather "Vessels" made by Abe no Semei and Ashiya Doman. They do not have guardian spirits, but rather their powers come from the entire world around them. The Male Twin star <Sol>, made by Semei, (in this case, Rokuro) is a vessel for the Yang energy, and the Female Twin Star <Luna>, made by Doman, (in this case, Benio) is a vessel for the Yin energy. Both energies normally act as polar opposites to each other, but it is only through a fusion of both powers that the Miko <Taiji> is born, who is not a reincarnation of any spirit, but rather an embodiment of the two powers in one form.

The main protagonist. A brash and headstrong 14-year old exorcist who was once motivated to be the strongest and cleanse all Kegare and sins. Rokuro was found by Seigen in Magano when he was 6 and had no memory of his past, after which Ryougo took him in. In the manga, he grew up in a valley of basaras before being found and taken in by humans. However, Yuuto Ijika caused a tragedy at the Hiinatsuki Dormitory which forced Rokuro in taking the lives of his friends who had been forcibly corrupted. Following this, his right arm was corrupted as well and became part Impurity with great offensive power. This tragedy made him nearly abandon exorcism until he met Benio, who inspires him to fight as an exorcist again. Despite not liking the idea of being her groom at first, he later develops feelings for her. During the time skip, Rokuro elevates his studies and training, making him popular in high school. Rokuro becomes head of the former Adashino House on Tsuchimikado Island. In the climax of Kegare escaping into reality, Rokuro and Benio are rejoined after a long separation. Benio's fate as an Impurity doesn't change Rokuro's feelings for her. The pair live peacefully on the island for the process of four years. Rokuro soon obtains a fragment of Yuuto's yang energy that slightly awakens his own transformation. After persuading the islanders to make an exception to Benio's misconduct, she and Rokuro officially get married. When Benio couldn't keep her promise, Rokuro found it pointless and fully transforms into the <Sol>. Getting some pep talk from Seigen, Rokuro makes his quest to venture Magano to locate his wife and even forms a party with the redeemed Kamui and Suzu. Rediscovering his childhood home and unknowingly kills Sutara, the Basara who raised him out of self-pity. Sutara's wife Asuha accepts Rokuro's generosity despite their differences.

In the manga, it is eventually revealed that the Twin stars are not truly human, and Rokuro is a vessel for Yang energy. He was created by Abe no Seimei, in other words, her son, so it appears as though his Guardian Spirit is Seimei, but in reality, neither he nor Benio has a Guardian spirit. In the anime, he is actually the Hajo-ó (Cataclysm King or Star Destroyer King), an extremely powerful Impurity created by Abe no Seimei who is destined to wipe out humanity should they become a threat to the world.

The main heroine. A serious, 14-year old girl, she vowed to become the strongest exorcist and destroy all Kegare in order to avenge her parents' death, who died protecting her. She wears a fox mask during battle. Upon meeting Rokuro she inspired him to return to being an exorcist, and despite not agreeing with the idea of becoming his bride, she secretly admires him for his tenacity, claiming that it is his sole redeeming quality. Benio has a taste for Ohagi. She admired her brother Yuuto until she learns his true colors. She loses both of her legs in the battle against Yuuto, but in the process, gets Impurity legs as replacements from Kamui (like Rokuro's arm) increasing her speed abilities to fight beside Rokuro. After the time skip, both seem to have become even closer with Benio silently noting that she has fallen in love with him. When receiving Sayo's enchantment, Benio's guardian appears to be of a dark entity that rivals with the Basara Impurity and is revealed by Kuzunoha to be Ashiya Doman, Abe no Seimei's archrival. She later loses her ability to exorcise and decides to stay while Rokuro leaves to Tsuchimikado Island ahead of her, but before that, she confirms her love for him and kisses him for the first time. She later learns from Chinu, the first impurity, that she has not actually lost her powers, but is awakening her real powers instead; the powers of Yin, as Benio is not a human, but an Impurity in a human's skin. Experiencing the oppression of past Lunas and noticing a <Sol> weren't beside them, Benio unlocks her Impurity transformation and rejoins Rokuro just in time for their rematch against Yuuto. After the second time skip, Benio gains an eyepatch similar to Yuuto's. Benio's secret is eventually expose and place in custody. Rokuro busted her out and convinces the exorcist community to trust Benio again and accept their marriage. With Tsuchimikado Island overwhelmed by a kegare pandemic, Benio is forced to give up her humanity to defeat the mayhem, only then she receives hatred from the civilians and leaves for Magano. In her futile attempt to dissolve Sakanashi's plot, she is overcome by negative emotions to escape her fate and destroy the mainland in so that she and Rokuro can live together without the Twin Stars.

Seika Dormitory

Rokuro's friend and fellow exorcist, who often acts as a surrogate big brother. During the first few chapters of the Manga and the first few episodes of the Anime, Ryougo would always pester Rokuro to become an Exorcist again. He is engaged to fellow resident Haruka after proposing to her which she accepted, he and Haruka get married at the end of the anime.

He's an exorcist that has his face covered by his hair.

He's an exorcist with a red streak that runs down his hair.

Mayura's grandfather and Yukari's father.

Benio's legal guardian.

Twelve Guardians
The Twelve Guardians, literally meaning Heavenly Commanders, are a group of twelve elite exorcists stationed on Tsuchimikado Island, the place where Magano was first created, to prevent the Impurities from overrunning the mainland. Second only to Arima Tsuchimikado among the exorcists in power, each use one of the twelve familiars of Abe no Seimei and inherit a portion of his power through their use of his familiars. The twelve families that they come from are descended from the twelve original companions of Abe no Seimei. In the anime, they are not stationed in Tsuchimikado, and usually perform missions across the country in pairs.

Current members

Rokuro's childhood friend and the daughter of one of the most powerful exorcists in the world. Mayura has extremely well-endowed breasts. She was forced to become a Fallen Impurity by Yuuto then goes on a rampage before being cleansed by Rokuro and Benio. After recovering, Mayura dedicates herself to follow Rokuro's path as a useful exorcist and requests Seigen to train her for the next two years. Initially timid with herself, she acquires Seigen's charm, Byakko, and soon takes her father's place as head of the Amakawa House and one of the Heavenly Commanders. She has feelings for Rokuro and feels envious of Benio's relationship to Rokuro and her strength at first, but later becomes her closest friend, deciding to support her relationship with him instead. Mayura eventually gains romantic interest in Shimon, which is apparently requited and forms a partnership with him. In the video game, Mayura is one of the Twin Star candidates along Benio and three other new characters.

Considered a child prodigy who despite only being 2 years older than Rokuro has attained the rank of Heavenly Commander, holding the title "Suzaku". Shimon is also Seigen's former student. He possesses the ability of flight and hates vehicles. His goal is to end the 1000-year war and break Sayo's heavy burden to let her live a long and free life. While he initially looked down on Rokuro and co, after they saved Sayo from two Basaras, he sees them in a new light and with a new respect and states that he looks forward to the day they will fight together. Shimon aims to surpass Tenma, due to their childhood rivalry. When Tenma used a prohibited enchantment that severed Shimon's leg during the Exorcist Games, he thought his days as a exorcist are done. Fortunately he gained a prosthesis replacement and proven Tenma that fate is not set in stone.

She is a exorcist, holding the title "Tenkō", who is Benio's former master. Subaru appears to be a young woman with long blonde hair wearing a white hat and a white dress. Like Arima, she intends to improve the Twin Stars' relationship in marriage and arranges them to date each other. She unleashes talismans from her fan deck and it forms into numerous guns, etc. In the manga, after a match with Mayura in the Exorcist Games, Subaru takes Mayura as her new apprentice.

Tatara appears to be a priest who wears a paper mask that reflects his mood. His title is Tōda (騰蛇 "Soaring Snake"). He is actually a 600-year old Shikigami. He's known as the most chaotic of the Heavenly Commanders. In the manga, he acts as an enforcer, punishing exorcists who fight among themselves using enchantments outside of Magano. In the anime, he is regularly accompanied with Subaru and a mentor for the Twin Stars. Tatara has a history with Kuranashi. He never speaks for the most part, unless aggravated.

A self-confident Heavenly Commander. He stands with the title "Taijō". Not much is known of Arata's personality, other than his diverge habit in addressing a person's name of putting "-tan" at the end. Likes reading doujinshi. He is the acting principal of Seiyouin Exorcist Academy on Tsuchimikado Island. Aside from his teachings, Arata's position is of taking readings and monitoring the activities in Magano.

He has blue eyes and is seen with his mouth covered. Not often showing his fighting style he can be assumed to be formidable enough to justify his title as a Heavenly Commander. He is an exorcist known as "Seiryū" (青龍 "Azure Dragon"). He's a directing doctor on Tsuchimikado Island. In his younger days, his duty was to help ill children reach full improvement. He experienced a unavoidable tragedy in choosing to saved the island over children that were taken hostage. Comparing to Rokuro, after he is beaten in the Exorcist Games, Rokuro and Kengo convince Kankurou to move on and he fulfills his bargain to support Rokuro's House.

He is an exorcist who has shown to be somewhat irritable, easily annoyed at his fellow Heavenly Commander, Kankuro, when they introduced themselves. Known as "Genbu" (玄武 "Black Tortoise"). He is also shown to have a miserly personality and is very greedy when it comes to money. Working as an instructor on Tsuchimikado for younger exorcists. He is childhood friends with Kankurou.

Narumi Ioroi's second daughter who inherits the title of "Kōchin" after his death, Shizuru aims to be the strongest of all female exorcists. She has a tomboyish personality and initially disregards exorcists from the mainland though her opinion changes after Rokuro saves her, developing a crush on him since then. She had received a scar on her face that might have imbued her with Yin energy.

 

Cordelia is an exorcist equipped with mechanical devices. Her suited title is "Tenkū". Most of the time she shows no facial expression and speaks in a robotic voice by spelling her words out which do not come from her mouth. Shozan, whom Cordelia (formerly known as Tsuyuko) looked up to like her big brother, implanted her mind in an artificial body for the use of enchantment armor control as the lead representative of the Kasukami family.

He is labeled as the strongest among the Heavenly Commanders, he can slice his enemies with his sword and bring total annihilation in its surroundings without any use of talisman enhancements. His title is "Kijin," that contains the source of deceased female Twin Stars. In the manga, they state that his latent power is so high, that he may not even know how to use talismans because they are useless to him. For generations, selected candidates of the Unomiya House are force kill one another during a remote dark ritual till the last standing will be Heavenly Commander, the latest being Tenma who endured the sorrow of his brethren. An oracle and the death of his sister cursed the world around him making Tenma incomprehensible. In the major battle against Yuuto, Tenma's heritage allows him and Rokuro to perform Resonance. Yuuto's sudden Unchain evolution takes them by surprise and then Tenma blocks the attack for Rokuro and lost several of his limbs and barely survives in the end.

Former Members

Mayura's divorced father who was the former master of Rokuro and Yuuto, he left his family as he did not wish for his duties to interfere with their lives. He displays a cold exterior yet caring. Seigen renounces his status as a Heavenly Commander due from losing his right arm to his traitorous student Yuuto. Despite the loss of his arm, he is not heavily impeded while fighting regular Kegare and still dominates Rokuro in sparring matches. When Mayura's skills is approved Seigen passes over his "Byakko" the White Tiger title to her.

 

He is a muscular exorcist who has faith in strength that cannot be left unused. His title is "Kōchin". His earth elements allow him to uproar structures made out of the environment to attack his enemies. He has a short-standard wife and nine children. His schoolmates, Arima, Arata, and Seigen made a formidable quest for leading a squad of fifty against Chikura, the previous eighth nurse-like Basara, that posed a centuries old threat. He is mortally wounded in a battle against Gabura and has Shizuru inherit his title before passing away.

Miku is an exorcist with long, pink, curly hair. She expresses strict responsibility as a Heavenly Commander, and execute missions in cleansing all Kegare regardless of any unusual situation. Her title is "Daion". She is older than she looks, stated by Tenma to be 56. Her enchantment is based on plush dolls. In the anime, she was paired with Sakura's father (for whom she had feelings as well) long before she was born. When she discovered Sakura's father was to be married, she accepted the fact sadly without complaint. In a dreadful battle in Magano, Miku used her last remaining strength on saving Sakura and Ioroi's squad from an unbeatable Basara.

Sakura is an exorcist and is known as "Rikugō". She has long chestnut hair tied with a pink bow near the end and is topped with a big, white and green hat. In the anime, she is paired with fellow Heavenly Commander, Miku. Her weapon of choice is a scythe. She, like her father, has a very loud personality, shouting when speaking to anyone. Sakura looks up to Miku as her surrogate mother. In the manga, Sakura received a critical blow from Gabura during the invasion impurities, and both fell into an abyss, aside their difference.

Antagonists

The main antagonist of the series. Yuuto is Benio's twin brother and an old friend turned enemy of Rokuro who supposedly died two years ago at the Hiinatsuki Dormitory. The truth is Yuuto had been using the cadets as experimental subjects, including Rokuro, the only successful subject, being forced to kill them, an event therefore known as the "Hiinatsuki Tragedy", that inflicted such a trauma on Rokuro that he decided to quit exorcism until he met Benio. Yuuto's objective is to become the ultimate exorcist by attaining the complete power of yang (the spiritual powers of humanity) and yin (the spiritual powers of the Kegare); which would result in eradicating all life in existence. Upon learning his plans, Rokuro and Benio started to focus on their training with the main purpose of defeating him as Rokuro wants to avenge his dead friends, and Benio intends to defeat her brother as a sign of atonement for the sake of her family's honor. His entire body had direct contact with a Fallen Impurity; transforming into one in the battle with Rokuro and Benio. In the anime, Yuuto was born with an unnecessary existence and acts as an guidance for Rokuro, so that one of them can become the King of Impurities, and sees Benio as an inferior to his only means of living due to her engagement with Rokuro. In the manga, Yuuto was aspired to protect his family in his youth, until an accident caused him to fall comatose for half a year. Due to being a Twin Star's sibling, Yuuto experienced visions of the catastrophe prophecy of exorcists and mankind, thus rendering his personality to mental disorder and guilty conscience. A dying Yuuto could be heard singing a song from his childhood.

Basara
The Basara are the most powerful Impurities in existence with each gaining intelligence, speech, and a human-like body by absorbing the energy of the exorcists they killed. Like exorcists, they can use their own version of enchanted gear and talismans to strengthen their powers. Unlike regular Impurities, their bodies do not disappear once they are killed. Originally, there were a total of 11 active Basara. Some of them did not appear in the anime series and were replaced by some original ones. After the death of most Basara, new ones were created.

The first and oldest of the eleven Basara. She is labeled as "most powerful" though inexplicably has low enchantments and shares a striking resemblances to Abe no Seimei. Chinu's actually a prototype Impurity long experimented in Ashiya Doman's research to countermeasure the King of Impurities. Unlike other Basara, she takes keen interest in human society. Meeting Benio in person, like many previous female Twin stars, Chinu offered her dormant powers to be awakened at the cost of her humanity.

The second and the de facto leader of the eleven Basara. His role in the manga is same as Kuranashi in the anime. Unlike Chinu, Sakanashi has no qualms killing humans or impurities for power. Not only his "Pitch Black Puppet" enchantment allows him to engulf the boundaries of physics; Sakanashi's final white form called "Unchain" can effortlessly match a Head Exorcist. He misled the Basaras into cooperating with him. By the end of the exorcist games, Sakanashi implements his diabolic plan to keep the Heavenly Commanders at bay, luring Arima onto the battlefield to kill him otherwise, and releasing a herd of Impurities through the gateway and into Tsuchimikado Island to lead humanity to oblivion. He is destroyed by a suicide attack from Arima. His death led the Yang embodiment that he confined a millennium ago to being set free and seeks out its vessel, Rokuro, to devour and forcibly his awakening. Five years later, Sakanashi resurrected in child form and resume his plan to spur Benio into following the path of <Luna> embedded with twisted idealizism. 

The third of the eleven Basara. His risk level is SS. In the manga, he is the one responsible for the death of Tsubaki Sada, Sakura's father. Strangely, he slightly resembles Tsubaki, having similar hairstyles. Gabura is playful in killing humans as like some sport. He uses instant shock wave enchantments, similar to Rokuro's gold smash, shown while targeting the Ioroi squad. Sakura and Miku arrived with reinforcements to focus all fire on Gabura for the long-waited battle. However, Gabura proved to be too much of a challenge, and so Sakura and Shizuru opened a portal to transport him to a far distance location, while a dying Miku used her last remaining energy to mighty push Gabura in it. In the next battle with Sakura, Gabura's memories of sorrow resurface when witnessing a child's pain, and Sakura experience these factors gaining small empathy with Gabura as they fall to their deaths together.

The fourth of the eleven Basara. Hijirimaru enjoys toying with humans and has absolutely no pity for them. He enjoys killing his opponents to awake the rage and hatred of their loved one, in order to gain more power after killing them too. He and Higano kidnap Sayo into Magano in order to feed on her spiritual power but is stopped by Shimon, Rokuro, Benio and Mayura. After absorbing Higano's enchanted powers in order to get stronger, Hijirimaru is destroyed by the Twin Star Exorcists' combined power. He is revealed to be motivated to obtain enough power to let Higano and himself watch the sky on Earth without the risk of being turned to dust by Earth's yang energy.

The fifth of the eleven Basara. He wears a magician's outfit and hat. He summons impurities the size of fortresses to ambush Rokuro's squad with the determination of avenging Hijirimaru, his former partner. Shiromi is returning the flavor by taking hostages that are close to Rokuro. Rokuro escapes from a Impurity devouring him, and his squad set up a distraction to surprise Shiromi, while Rokuro hits him hard. Despite this, a still standing Shiromi impales Rokuro and his team, that leaves a repeated disaster image of his peers from the Hinatsuki Dormitory to his eyes. Before Rokuro could muster an unprepared power to fight back, Arima emerges and saves the team. Shiromi then died realizing Sakanashi may have been using him.

The sixth of the eleven Basara. Kaguya is a foul mouthed and mentally unstable impurity. She wears a lieutenant uniform and using a whip, obsessive about her "darling," which is a male exorcist-turned zombie. Her enchantments are base on water elements, to which she can transform into a full body liquid. The source of her hatred to all human and Impurity comes from her past relationship with a human lover once believing that hope for love is real, until she was betrayed and discriminated. Kaguya rages further knowing the fact that Benio, who is now a Impurity could actually be allowed see a human (Rokuro), and witnessing Kaguya's darling's corpse get smashed. In her retaliation, Kaguya completely alters her body into effective water substance to drown Kamui and Benio, only to fail, and Kaguya's body then vaporized leading to her death.

The seventh of the eleven Basara. He has a scarred left eye and controls yang energy to create magnetic fields. In his youth, Gaja was among many experimental subjects hoard by the Mitejima Household until his escape. Subaru seemingly sympathize with Gaja. Encountering Subaru again when she is left alone in Magano, she becomes enamored to Gaja out of self-pity. Despite being an formidable foe, Gaja doesn't have real fighting spirit.

The eighth of the eleven Basara. Shioji wears a girlish custom-made private school uniform and narrates his speech. He specializes in reanimating former exorcists from the dead and enforce them to fight other fellow brethren. The realization of Sakanashi's delude doesn't sway Shioji's strategy, as he exasperatingly resumes annihilate many exorcists he could. Until then Tatara ambushes Shioji and impales him through the chest. With his last thoughts in mind, he deeply wishes for rebirth but not as a mere impurity.

The ninth of the eleven Basara, he has followed Hijimaru since the later found him as an ordinary juvenile Impurity. Unlike his partner, he is calm and collected and is not interested in obtaining more enchanted powers for himself. On the other hand, Higano is highly dedicated to the latter and his dream, up to the point of sacrificing himself to take a mortal attack for him and transferring his enchanted powers to Hijimaru to make him stronger.

The tenth of the eleven Basara. She wears a bunny outfit with great sensing abilities to spell power. Having to be a masochist, Yuzuriha has no qualms posing as bait to progress Sakanashi's plan to direct Impurities out to the real world. She is seen carrying Sakanashi's disfigure head from his defeat in Arima's hands. In turn of events, Yuzuriha claims no resentment in having no will of her own and just wants to be useful to Sakanashi.

The youngest and eleventh of the eleven Basara. He is also responsible for the death of Benio's parents. Though, he tends to let his opponents choose the death of their preference, and always gives them ten seconds to decide. He seeks entertainment by fighting humans without caring about which side (Human or Impurity) will be destroyed, and loves humans because they are weak yet strive to grow stronger. Despite knowing of Benio's hatred towards him, he usually appears to help her, hoping to fight her once she becomes a worthy opponent. Kamui seems on good terms with Chinu. Over the course of the series Kamui's interest in Benio grows until he comes to care for her unconditionally without realizing it. When Kaguya severely wounded him, Kamui questioned if he should die for his crimes but Benio encouraged him not to throw his life away. He awakened his ultimate white form (Unchain) to protect Benio from Kaguya. He waits the day to willingly fight the Twin Stars, and is implied to have stopped killing humans due to Benio's influence.

Other characters

The leader of all exorcists in Japan, and the one who arranges the marriage between Benio and Rokuro. He later relocates them to a fancy villa. While eccentric and comedic, he also possesses an enigmatic, devious, and even sinister side. His greatest enchantment is summoning the Avalokiteśvara. On the other hand, he is also powerful enough that two of the Heavenly Commanders declined to join him on the battlefield as they would be merely a hindrance to him. Sometimes he appear uncaring in the case of the Twin Stars, when they are in danger, although in fact he wants them to prove themselves worthy of their title and strengthen their powers and bonds together unlike the previous couples that were chosen to become the Twin Stars, who died due to their carelessness. In the manga, in his battle against Sakanashi, Arima executes his Fallen Impurity transformation as a last resort, sacrificing himself to defeat the Basara.

Benio's familiar who is very protective of her. He has the ability to possess vehicles and machines to assist the Twin Stars in their missions. While he appears since the beginning in the anime series, Kinako only appears in the manga when Rokuro takes ownership of Benio's house, which was abandoned after her clan was disbanded following her parents' deaths and Yuuto's betrayal, guarded by him since then.

Mayura's mother and the ex-wife of Seigen Amawaka. She is a biologist on the mainland.

She is Shimon's younger cousin addressed as his little sister. He nicknames her "Chiiko". Despite being 11-years old she is the heir and Proctor of the Ikaruga House. Sayo is the host of the guardian Kuzunoha that allows her to bestow a ceremony of divination on exorcists to see their quality essence. However, harboring such a strong guardian spirit greatly shortens her lifespan to less than two decades. Spending her entire life on the closed-off island, she gains the wonderful opportunity to visit the mainland upon Rokuro's request to be tested rather he'll be chosen worthy, making Sayo fall for him and considers him her prince and was clingy towards him whenever she's near him and managed to make Benio appear envious towards Sayo in her own way. Four years later, Sayo trained to harness Kuzunoha's powers and participate in exorcising impurities. Once learnt of Rokuro's proposal to Benio, she hastily challenges Benio on a mission in Magano in doing so to get Sayo's approval.

The unreliable son of Arima. He only makes his debut, when Rokuro enrolls at Seiyouin Exorcist Academy on Tsuchimikado Island. Arima is initially acknowledged by all lower clansmen, until he decides to resign in living in the Enmado's house after Rokuro taken over its property as a branch member. Prideful of wanting loyalty from his father, Arimori swore his allegiance to Rokuro instead. Arimori tricked several young exorcists in signing for Enmado House, who thought it would be the Tsuchimikado House, regardless of the deception the members serve affiliation and companionship to Rokuro and Arimori. He and Kinako cheered for Rokuro's victory in the Exorcist Games. In the battle between Sakanashi and Arima, Arimori finally earns his father's acceptance. Following Arima's death, Arimori is brought back to the Tsuchimikado House as the next Head Exorcist-in-training.

A young girl in anime-only. She is intelligent and very enthusiastic towards Rokuro and Benio. Similar to Rokuro, Sae is found in Magano with no memory. Rokuro and the others bring her to Seika Dormitory. She travels with the Twin Stars on the pursuit to exterminate the Dragon Spot outburst. Its proven that Sae possesses strong abilities she could deflect Basara's attacks. Eventually it is revealed that Sae came from a branch broken off from the Ame-no-mihashira, a gigantic tree barrier that separates Magano and the real world, and attained human form just like a tsukumogami, upsetting the balance between both realms, which is only restored when she returns to her former self, much to Rokuro and Benio's grief. She refers to Rokuro as "Papa", possibly due to his connection with Abe no Seimei.

An anime-only member of the Tsuchimikado family. He serves Arima, as his right-hand man, and after Arima's disappearance, he serves as the Stand-in for Head Exorcist. Unlike Arima, he is mostly silent, speaking only when needed. It is later revealed that Mikage is actually Abe no Seimei's Shikigami, created to watch his plan go into account, that the world will be rid of impurities.

A Basara with a moral colorful personality and hobby for metal rock and role playing. Suzu is an unnatural Basara who spawned without the use of absorbing spiritual energy from other exorcists. She prefers to fight her opponents in battle dancing performances, although she despises those who are cowards. Her music affects low spiritual users thus rendering them to mutation. She has an interest in Rokuro (who is her first time meeting a human). While she first appeared as an anime original character, Suzu officially appears in the manga as of chapter 76.

Anime Original

He is a mysterious Basara and is very powerful. He is always seen wearing a mask, which seems to hold a portion of his power. He is the main perpetrator who achieved in tampering the Ame-no-mihashira to access the Dragon Spots across the country pretending it's a game, in order to lure the Heavenly Commanders in a trap to extract their spiritual energy for ultimate strength. Having lived for hundreds of years as a Basara, Kuranashi has evolved long enough to display features almost human-like. His consciousness is overtaken by Yuuto when he attempts to absorb Yuuto's body, marking that Kuranashi was merely a pawn, as Yuuto all along been waiting for him to do so in order to take his stolen powers.

A Basara and Kuranashi's loyal servant. Moro can generate enchantments into her muscles from an armor. She is responsible for the death of Sakura's father twenty-years prior, until she finally faces justice against Sakura herself and Miku.

 
A flashy Basara that declares superiority. He adores gigantic shape Kegare that are helpful in combat. He is later defeated by the hands of Kankuro and Kengo.

A powerful butler-like Basara that the Twin Stars were helpless to defeat, who precisely shoots them his musket, until Tenma steps in and singlehandedly cleanses him in half. He appears in the manga and stands as a high position representing the inhabitants of the basara village.

 

They are the only Basara Twins. Chijiwa always wears a black suit, while Momochi wears white. Following Momochi's defeat, Chijiwa swears revenge against the Twin Stars (unaware that Kuranashi seppuku Momochi for seeing him useless and gave Chijiwa his brother's spiritual energy) but fails after being defeated by Shimon and Rokuro.

A lion faced True Serpent (a Kegare on the verge of becoming a Basara) who came from Magano to Human World through a Dragon spot to just see something beautiful. He became friend with Sae but later killed by an unhesitant Sakura and Miku.

Video game-only characters
Ran Ikuno

The youngest of the Twin Star candidates in the game, she is an innocent, airhead "little sister" type character with no real desire to be an exorcist.

Rimu Tennōji

Another of the Twin Star candidates in the game, she is a tomboy who lost part of her memory.

Ai Katsujō

The third of the original Twin Star candidates in the game. A composed and seductive "older sister" type, she has plenty of combat experience, and has a good relationship with Arima.

References

Twin Star Exorcists